AMLA is an acronym that may stand for:

Latin American Musicians Association (Spanish: Asociación de Músicos Latino Americanos)
American Mutual Life Association, a Slovenian-American fraternal organization
Administration of Muslim Law Act, an act of the Parliament of Singapore

See also
 Amla (disambiguation)